Svetla Yordanova (Besheva; born 8 May 1976) is a Bulgarian chess player and winner of the 2015 Women's Bulgarian Chess Championship.

In  chess, she received the FIDE titles of Woman FIDE Master (WFM)	in 2007 and Woman International Master (WIM) in 2008. In correspondence chess, she received the ICCF titles of Lady International Master (LIM) in 2010 and Lady Grandmaster (LGM) in 2011.

Yordanova became an FIDE Arbiter in 2011 and an International Arbiter in 2013.

References

External links 
 
 
 

1976 births
Living people
Bulgarian female chess players
Place of birth missing (living people)
Chess Woman International Masters
Chess arbiters